Crossman may refer to:

People
 Abdiel Crossman (1804–1859), U.S. politician in New Orleans
 Craig Crossman (born before 1995), American newspaper columnist
 Danny Crossman (born 1967), American football coach
 Doug Crossman (born 1960), Canadian ice hockey player
 Edgar G. Crossman (1895–1967), American lawyer, soldier and diplomat
 Fletcher Crossman (born 1965), British artist who has relocated to New York
 Frank Crossman (born before 2002), American materials scientist and engineer, and writer
 Garret Crossman (born 1982), Australian rugby league player
 Gary Crossman (born 1955), Canadian politician in New Brunswick
 George Crossman (1877–1947), English cricketer
 Graeme Crossman (born 1945), New Zealand international rugby union player
 Guy Crossman (1915–1989), Canadian Member of Parliament
 Kimberley Crossman (born 1988), New Zealand actress, dancer, stand-up comedian and cheerleader
 Mervyn Crossman (1935–2017), Australian field hockey player who competed in the 1960 and 1964 Summer Olympics
 Owen Crossman (1903–1963), rugby union player
 Pat Crossman (1940–2002), Canadian politician in New Brunswick
 Richard Crossman (AKA Dick Crossman, 1907–1974), British Labour Party politician and author
 Samuel Crossman (1623–1683), English churchman and hymnwriter
 William Crossman (1830–1901), British soldier and politician

Places
 Crossman, Western Australia, a town located in the Wheatbelt region
 Crossman (VTA), a light rail station operated by Santa Clara Valley Transportation Authority (VTA), located in Sunnyvale, California
 Crossman Bridge (AKA Gilbert Road Bridge), a truss bridge located in Warren, Massachusetts
 Crossman Pond, in Kingston, Massachusetts

See also 
 Crossmans, New Jersey, a neighborhood in Sayreville, Middlesex County, New Jersey, United States
 George Crossman House, a historic home located in the East Falls Church section of Arlington, Virginia
 

Occupational surnames
English-language occupational surnames